Gayre is a surname. Notable people with the surname include:

 Robert Gayre (1907–1996), Scottish anthropologist
 Clan Gayre
 John Gayre (disambiguation), multiple people

See also
 Gayer (surname)